Herbert Alfred Potts (1878 – before 1939) was an English footballer who played for Belgian clubs Antwerp and Beerschot AC.

Club career
He was the topscorer in the Belgian First Division in the 1900–01 and 1901–02 seasons, with 26 and 16 goals respectively, with the former tally possible being a record at the time until Gustave Vanderstappen broke it with 30 goals in the 1903–04 season.

International career
He featured in four unofficial matches with the Belgium national team between 1901 and 1904, in which he represented Belgium in friendly cup duels against the Netherlands. He scored 12 goals in those 4 caps, resulting in a strike rate of 3 goals per game.

Retirement
After retiring, he returned to England and worked in the import business.

Career statistics
Scores and results list Belgium's goal tally first, score column indicates score after each Potts goal.

References

1878 births
Date of birth missing
Date of death missing
English footballers
Royal Antwerp F.C. players
Beerschot A.C. players
Belgian Pro League players
English expatriate footballers
English expatriate sportspeople in Belgium
Expatriate footballers in Belgium
Association football forwards